World On Edge were a Canadian pop-rock group from Quebec from the early 1990s. The four-some comprised Rob Meyer, Steph Thompson, Peter Hopkins, and Jon Daniels.

History
The World on Edge members worked together in (West) Germany with Christian Schudde, their co-producer.  Their self-titled debut album World on Edge was released in 1991. It produced six singles which reached the Top 40 (based on a combination of charts from 'RPM 100 Singles' and 'The Record'); their best-known hit was "Still Beating". 

In 1992 the band was nominated as "most promising group of the year" at the Juno Awards, but did not win.

The 1993 follow-up album Against All Gods received little air play and the video to the lead single "Who Shot Harry" was not aired by muchmusic. Album sales were weak;  the group disbanded soon after. 

They toured with Roxette on the Canadian leg of that group's 1992 Canadian tour.

Singles

References

Musical groups with year of establishment missing
Canadian pop rock music groups
English-language musical groups from Quebec